Amarpur is a Nagar Panchayat in district of Banka, Bihar. The Amarpur city is divided into 14 wards for which elections are held every 5 years.

Amarpur Nagar Panchayat has total administration over 4,793 houses to which it supplies basic amenities like water and sewerage. It is also authorize to build roads within Nagar Panchayat limits and impose taxes on properties coming under its jurisdiction.

Amarpur is notified area in Banka district in the state of Bihar, India.

Demographics
The Amarpur Nagar Panchayat has population of 25,336 of which 13,452 are males while 11,884 are females as per report released by Census India 2011.

Population of Children with age of 0-6 is 4186 which is 16.52% of total population of Amarpur (NP). In Amarpur Nagar Panchayat, Female Sex Ratio is of 883 against state average of 918. Moreover, Child Sex Ratio in Amarpur is around 866 compared to Bihar state average of 935. Literacy rate of Amarpur city is 66.76% higher than state average of 61.80%. In Amarpur, Male literacy is around 72.54% while female literacy rate is 60.24%.

Market and livelihood

Amarpur market has a feel of both urban and rural India. Market comprises all the essentials of modern needs. Amarpur market is a hub for nearby villages.

Amarpur market is dominated by baniya community Bhagat Samaj and Saundik Samaj.
Many retailer shop for clothes can be seen in market serving as wholeseller shop for small villages nearby. Jwellery shop also make a good chunk of Amarpur market. Core livelihood for many remains agriculture.

Sugarcane mills which used to be many in number 15–20 years back has seen a great downfall due to non adopting of latest technology and lack of government support.

Peace environment of Amarpur due to minimal crime and urban nature of market make it a choice for villagers nearby to migrate from village to Amarpur city thus resulting huge land rate in market area and on Amarpur Bhagalpur SH 25 and Amarpur Shahkund Road.

Employment

Due to lack of industries opportunity of employment is very less in Amarpur. Few construction firms are generating some employment while they are growing bigger. Amarpur Construction Company Private Limited is one of the oldest and renowned firm in this field, Amarpur as origin and head office. It alone employs more than tons of people. Das and company is a new entrant in construction industry from Amarpur city.

References

 http://www.census2011.co.in/data/town/801355-amarpur-bihar.html
 http://www.accpltd.com

Cities and towns in Banka district